The men's shot put event at the 2003 European Athletics U23 Championships was held in Bydgoszcz, Poland, at Zawisza Stadion on 18 and 20 July.

Medalists

Results

Final
20 July

Qualifications
18 July
Qualifying 18.70 or 12 best to the Final

Participation
According to an unofficial count, 19 athletes from 11 countries participated in the event.

 (3)
 (1)
 (3)
 (2)
 (1)
 (1)
 (1)
 (3)
 (1)
 (2)
 (1)

References

Shot put
Shot put at the European Athletics U23 Championships